This is a list of seasons completed by the Western Carolina Catamounts men's basketball team since formation in 1928. They are currently members of the Southern Conference and have appeared in the NCAA tournament one time.

Season results

References

Western Carolina Catamounts men's basketball seasons
Western Carolina Catamounts
Western Carolina Catamounts basketball seasons